Surya Kiran is an aerobatics demonstration team of the Indian Air Force. The Surya Kiran Aerobatic Team (SKAT) was formed in 1996 and are a part of the 52nd Squadron of the IAF. The team has since performed numerous demonstrations usually with nine aircraft. The squadron was composed of the HAL HJT-16 Kiran Mk.2 military trainer aircraft till 2011 and were based at the Bidar Air Force Station in Karnataka. The team was suspended in February 2011 and was re-established with Hawk Mk-132 aircraft in 2017.

History

Formation aerobatics is not new to the IAF. As early as 1944, the IAF had a display flight and later a few ad hoc teams carried out aerobatic displays on special occasions such as the Air Force Day parade and firepower demonstrations.

During the golden jubilee year of the IAF in 1982, picked fighter pilots from various squadrons formed an aerobatic team for the IAF called 'The Thunderbolts'. Flying blue and white Hunter fighter bomber, this team performed for about a decade and it gave its last public display in 1989.

The experience gained from the Thunderbolts was put to good use by a four-aircraft team called the Formation Aerobatic Team, set up in Bidar in 1990 on Kiran-II trainers. Though the team did not give any public displays, it ensured that formation aerobatic skills were maintained in the IAF.

In early 1996, serious planning began for AVIA-96, the first major air show and aviation trade event ever hosted in India. The organisers' initial intention was to invite an aerobatic team from overseas, but some senior IAF officers were confident that the world's fourth largest air force would be able to field its own team. This formed the genesis of the present team, the Surya Kiran, meaning rays of the sun.

In May 1996, Wg Cdr Kuldeep Malik, who as a Flight Lieutenant had been a member of the 'Thunderbolts', and who was then serving as an instructor at the Defence Services Staff College, Wellington, was moved to Bidar, with instructions to raise a new aerobatic team. The pioneer team comprised Wg Cdr Kuldeep Malik (Team Leader) Sqn Ldr A K Murgai, Sqn Ldr V K Khorana, Sqn Ldr S Prabhakaran, Sqn Ldr A R Gore, Sqn Ldr R K Obheroi, Sqn Ldr N Kanitkar, Sqn Ldr P K Vohra, Flt Lt T. Sharma, Flt Lt K Prem Kumar and Flt Lt K.K. Dubey.

The Surya Kiran Formation Aerobatic Team (SKAT) flew its first 6 aircraft formation sortie on 27 May 96 at AF Stn Bidar.

During these early months the team flew overtime, graduating from aerobatics in four-aircraft box formation to six-aircraft in shockwave formation. The first six-aircraft formation took wings on 8 August 1996. There were two manoeuvres which the team finally managed to get through with a little bit of trouble. The first was the Goblet roll and the other the Tango roll – the latter incidentally was a historic first for the IAF because even the famed Thunderbolts did not do this manoeuvre.

Soon the SKAT was tasked to carry out their first public display – a flawless six-aircraft display for the golden jubilee celebrations of Air Force Administrative College, Coimbatore. on 15 September 1996, that was highly appreciated by all those who witnessed it.

In 1998, with Wg Cdr A K Murgai as the CO, the team expanded to a nine-aircraft formation. Considering the team was just two years old, it was no small achievement. The team first displayed a formation of nine-aircraft during the Independence Day fly past over the Red Fort in 1998. The first full-fledged nine-aircraft aerobatic display was to follow at Palam on 8 October 1998, to mark Air Force Day.
In November 1999, the Royal Air Force's Red Arrows aerobatic team was transiting through India en route to Australia. The Surya Kiran team was at Hindon to interact with them and a lucky few managed a sortie in the Hawk. Three months later the French aerobatic team ‘Patrouille de France’ was at Pune and the two teams met and flew some sorties in the Alpha jet. An interaction between the two teams resulted in the SKAT adopting the "Synchro" manoeuvre. This raised their standard a couple of notches and added more colour to its displays. The first synchro sequence was displayed during the Combined Graduation Parade at Air Force Academy in June 2000.

The team has carried out over 500 displays in 72 cities across the country, from Srinagar in the north to Tiruvananthapuram in the south and from Naliya, the westernmost air station, to Chabua, the country's easternmost airfield. Srinagar, at an altitude of 5,436 feet is the highest airfield from which it has operated, when it performed over Dal Lake in 1998. Flying over sea is the toughest as the vast, flat expanse of water affects depth perception. It has also performed in the capitals of Sri Lanka, Myanmar, Thailand and Singapore.

On completion of a decade of precision formation aerobatics, the Surya Kiran, the youngest nine-aircraft aerobatic team in the world, was conferred with Squadron status. With effect from 1 May 2006, the team became IAF's No. 52 Squadron.

After the performance in Bengaluru in February 2011, the Surya Kirans were grounded because the Air Force faced a severe shortage of training aircraft. 
In Feb 2015, the Surya Kirans were resurrected as a four ac team with the induction of the British Hawk Advanced Jet Trainer, being assembled in India by the state-run HAL under the command of then Wing Commander Ajit Kulkarni. The team achieved its target of performing four ac, six ac and nine ac maiden displays for Air Force Day in 2015, 2016 and 2017 respectively. The team was also granted operational role for a few years. The team since resurrection has performed several public displays including many presidential events and two displays abroad viz Srilanka and Dubai. .

Aircraft

Surya Kiran operated 16 HJT-16 Kiran Mk.2 trainer aircraft. The "day-glo orange" and white colour scheme painted Kiran MK II is used by the IAF to train its fighter pilots in basic fighter manoeuvres and weapon delivery. It was designed by Dr. Gadge, the then chief designer of Hindustan Aeronautics Ltd in 1960 and produced at HAL Bangalore. This ac weighs about five tons and is powered by an Orpheus engine that generates a thrust of 1906 kg, helping the aircraft to achieve a maximum speed of 780 km/h or 0.7 Mach. The Kiran MK II can also be deployed in counter insurgency operations armed with integral guns, 250 kg bombs and 68 mm rockets.

A particular difficulty faced by the team was the side-by-side seating arrangement in the Kiran cockpits. The members flying to the left of the leader have to fly from the right seat, whereas the left seat is the master seat. Therefore, some aircraft have been modified to fly solo from the right seat. In unmodified aircraft, the pilot flying on the left of the leader has to fly in two pilot configuration.

The two inboard drop tanks of Surya Kiran Kiran Mk 2 aircraft have been modified to carry color dye for generating smoke. Diesel is used for generating white smoke and colored dye is mixed with diesel to generate colored smoke. Because of the smoke modification, only the two outboard drop tanks can be used to carry fuel, which gives Surya Kiran aircraft a maximum range of 280 km. For displays, Suryakiran aircraft fly only with two inboard drop tanks, which carry dye for smoke generation.
The team has formed up again with 4 Hawk aircraft, with a new paint scheme. In October 2015, the Defense Ministry concluded negotiations between HAL and BAE Systems for the purchase of twenty BAE Systems Hawk Mk.132 aircraft for the Surya Kiran which will be dedicated to the aerobatics display role and fitted with smoke canisters.

Organisation

The AOC of AFS Bidar serves as the guardian for the Squadron when it is at base or touring.

Personnel
The team had a total of 13 pilots of whom only 9 are flying at any given time. Pilots are selected twice a year for a three-year tour of duty. Only Fighter aircraft qualified pilots are selected. All pilots in the team are Qualified flying instructors (QFI's) with about 2,000 hours of fighter flying experience and 1,000 hours on the Kiran aircraft. The Team is headed by a Commanding Officer who is also the leader of the formation during display sorties. The Team Leader has the opportunity of selecting his future team pilots after subjecting them to grueling flight trials and tests.

Besides the pilots, the team had a Flight Commander, an Administrator and qualified Technical Officers. The Flight Commander is in charge of operational planning. The Administrator, apart from looking after administrative requirements of the Team, also provides the commentary during public displays. The Senior Engineering Officer (the SEO or 'Spanner'), along with fifty technicians, has the task of maintaining and servicing the Team's aircraft. In all technical aspects, the decision of the Senior Engineering Officer is the final word.

Aerobatics
Pilots from the Bidar Air Force base, the second biggest Indian air force training centre in the country, flew in formations of three, six and nine aircraft. The Kiran MKII plane, modified for aerobatic display, was used to create parallel and horizontal flight designs, releasing colours of the Indian flag using aerosols, and popular patterns like the heart and arrow, the water spring and the apple.

The duration of the display routine varies from about ten to twenty minutes depending upon the location of the display site.  The first half of the routine includes turns, wingovers, loops and barrel rolls in various nine aircraft formations. During the second half, the formation splits into two groups to carry out a variety of manoeuvres like splits, level and rolling crosses, inverted runs, the heart loop etc.

Performance
On an average, the team performs over 30 shows a year, and flies three sorties a day during the training season and two a day whilst on aerobatics display. The nine aircraft take off in groups of three and join up in close formation, maneuvering between speeds of 150 to 650 km/h with their wing tips less than 5 metres apart. The maneuvers subject the pilots to alternating g-forces between +6 to –1.5.

The team has performed at all Aero India shows until 2011, as well as during the International Fleet Review in Mumbai in February 2001. The team, under the leadership of Wing Commander Amit Tiwari, performed abroad for the first time in Colombo, Sri Lanka, to mark the 50th Anniversary Celebrations of the Sri Lankan Air Force. In February 2004, Suryakiran led by Wing Commander S Prabahkaran performed at the Asian Aerospace-2004 air show in Singapore. The Team, under the command of Wing Commander S Bansal, made its debut in Malaysia in December 2007 at the Langkawi International Maritime and Aerospace Exhibition (LIMA) 2007 from 4 to 8 December, on the  occasion of the 50th Anniversary of Malaysia's Independence. Whilst in Malaysia, the team also displayed at Subang airfield of Kuala Lumpur on 29 Nov 07. In December, 2007, the team in coordination with the Royal Thai Air Force conducted a nine-aircraft Aerobatic display to commemorate the 80th Birth Anniversary of His Majesty the King of Thailand. In November 2008, the team was invited to participate in the Zhuhai Airshow, China where Suryakiran were the only foreign participants in this airshow. On the return from China, the team displayed in Laos as well.

Accidents
A Surya Kiran aircraft crashed while practicing on 18 March 2006 near Air Force Station, Bidar during a training sortie. Two team pilots, Wing Commander Dheeraj Bhatia and Squadron Leader Shailender Singh, were injured fatally.

A young Indian Air Force (IAF) pilot had a lucky escape on 23 December 2007 when a HJT-16 Kiran, a military trainer aircraft of Surya Kiran, aerobatics demonstration team, crash-landed inside the Biju Patnaik Airport.

Another crash of Surya Kiran aircraft happened on 21 January 2009 when Wing Commander R.S. Dhaliwal VM (35) of the Indian Air Force was fatally injured when his aircraft crashed in an open field at Bellura village close to the Air Force Station, Bidar at 8:45 am on a routine practice sortie.

Two Surya Kiran aircraft crashed at 11:54 AM, 19 February 2019 in Bengaluru while practicing for the Aero India 2019. Two pilots ejected safely and the third pilot Wing Cdr Sahil Gandhi succumbed to his injuries and later died in the hospital.

See also
 Sarang
 Sagar Pawan
 List of aerobatic teams

References

External links

 The Indian Armed Forces, Surya Kiran page
 The Ed Steenhoek list of Military Aerobatic Teams, Surya Kiran page
 Bharat-rakshak.com, Surya Kiran page

News
 
 Flying colours of courage
$

Images
 Suryakiran at Aero India 2007
 Synchro-cross
 IAF picture gallery
 IAF Surya Kiran
 Image in Samachar India
 SKAT duo - image form KenSekhon.ca gallery
 SKAT show at Airshow 2011

Videos
 Video from Google videos
 Video from Youtube.com

Indian Air Force
Aerobatic teams